Bar Girls is a lesbian-themed romantic comedy film written by Lauran Hoffman, adapted by Hoffman from her stage play of the same name for the screen in 1994. Starring Nancy Allison Wolfe, Liza D'Agostino, Camila Griggs and Michael Harris and directed by Marita Giovanni.

Premise
The film follows the lives of several gay women in the Los Angeles area who socialize at a local lesbian bar called Girl Bar.

Cast
 Nancy Allison Wolfe as Loretta
 Liza D'Agostino as Rachel
 Camila Griggs as J.R.
 Michael Harris as Noah
 Justine Slater as Veronica
 Lisa Parker as Annie
 Pam Raines as Celia
 Paula Sorge as Tracy
 Cece Tsou as Sandy
 Caitlin Stansbury as Kimba
 Patti Sheehan as Destiny
 Lee Everett as Lee
 Betsy Burke as Cafe Waitress
 Laurie Jones as Laurie
 Chaz Bono (credited as Chastity Bono) as Scorp'

Reception
On Rotten Tomatoes the film has an approval rating of 25% based on reviews from 8 critics.

Home media
Bar Girls was released on Region 1 DVD on March 19, 2002.

References

External links 
 

1994 romantic comedy films
1994 films
American LGBT-related films
American films based on plays
Lesbian-related films
Orion Pictures films
1994 LGBT-related films
1990s English-language films
1990s American films